TL-301 is a nitrogen mustard vesicant.

See also
HN1 (nitrogen mustard)
HN2 (nitrogen mustard)
HN3 (nitrogen mustard)

References

Nitrogen mustard vesicants
Chloroethyl compounds
Isopropylamino compounds